Nampasso is a village and seat of the commune of Korodougou in the Cercle of Bla in the Ségou Region of southern-central Mali.

References

Populated places in Ségou Region